Novokubansky District is an administrative district (raion), one of the thirty-eight in Krasnodar Krai, Russia. As a municipal division, it is incorporated as Novokubansky Municipal District. It is located in the east of the krai. Its administrative center is the town of Novokubansk. Population:  The population of Novokubansk accounts for 40.4% of the district's total population.

Geography
The Kuban River flows through the district.

Climate
The district is vulnerable to extended drought conditions.

Economy
The district has very fertile soil, so the agriculture and food industry are developed. Farmlands cover , or 75% of the district's territory.

Transportation
Major federal roads and railway pass through the district, playing a substantial role in its economy and life of local communities.

References

Notes

Sources

Districts of Krasnodar Krai